"An Sommertagen" was released with "Um bei dir zu sein" from Christina Stürmer's fourth album, Lebe Lauter. Together, they were the second single from the album. Translated, Um bei dir zu sein means "To Be at Your Side", and An Sommertagen means "On Summer Days".

The single was certified Gold in Austria.

Charts and release history 
"Um bei dir zu sein"/"An Sommertagen" was originally only released in Austria as a double A-side single. Together, they reached number one on the Austrian single chart. No music video was made for "An Sommertagen", but "Um bei dir zu sein" was later released as the sixth single from the same album in Germany and a video was made for it.

References

2006 singles
Christina Stürmer songs
Number-one singles in Austria
2006 songs
Polydor Records singles